The 1804 United States presidential election in Tennessee took place between November 2 and December 5, 1804, as part of the 1804 United States presidential election. 778 votes were recorded, all of which were cast towards Thomas Jefferson, though the results of the state were incomplete.

During this election, Tennessee cast 5 electoral votes for Democratic-Republican Party incumbent nominee Thomas Jefferson.

References

Tennessee
1804